Pheasant is a bird of one of several genera within the subfamily Phasianinae, family Phasianidae,  order Galliformes.

Pheasant may also refer to:
Common pheasant (Phasianus colchicus) a species of large bird
HMS Pheasant, several ships of the Royal Navy
Operation Pheasant, military operation in Netherlands in World War II
Pheasant Aircraft Company, American aircraft manufacturer
Pheasant H-10, 1928 biplane
Pheasant Inn, Bassenthwaite, a public house in Cumbria, England

Places
Pheasant Branch, Wisconsin, a conservancy area in the United States
Pheasant Creek, a creek in Canada
Pheasant Creek, Queensland, a locality in Australia
Pheasant Creek, Victoria, a rural area in Australia
Pheasant Island, an island between France and Spain
Pheasant Island (Eutin), an island in Germany

People with the surname
Steven Pheasant (born 1951), English cricketer
Thomas Pheasant (born 1955), American interior designer

See also

Animal common name disambiguation pages